Lee Seung-hoon (born 1988) is a South Korean speed skater.

Lee Seung-hoon may also refer to:
Yi Seung-hun (1756–1801), Korean Catholic martyr
Lee Seung-hun (born 1938), South Korean cyclist
Lee Seung-hoon (boxer) (born 1960), South Korean boxer
Lee Seung-hoon (rapper) (born 1992), South Korean rapper under YG Entertainment
Lee Seung-hoon (tennis) (born 1979), South Korean tennis player